Adam Macrow (born 23 November 1978, in Victoria) is a professional race car driver.

In 1985, he started his motorsports career in karting. Over his time spent in karts, he won two national titles and ten Victorian titles. In 1995, he moved out of karts into Formula Vee, which was followed in 1996 by a move into Formula Ford. He won the National Championship in 1998. Macrow's Formula Ford title was the first title for the Australian manufacturer of Spectrum Cars, which have since run drivers such as Mark Winterbottom and John Martin.

In 1999, Macrow raced in Formula Holden, achieving a fourth-place finish in the series. In the same year, he started his career in V8 Supercars with Longhurst Racing, driving with Tony Longhurst in the Queensland 500 and Bathurst 1000. While this was a prize for winning the Australian Formula Ford Championship, it did not turn out well, with the pair retiring from both races.

In the following years, Macrow continued in his role as a co-driver for various teams. The highlight of his career came in 2005, achieving a fifth place at the Sandown 500 and a third place at the Bathurst 1000 for Triple Eight Race Engineering. In 2006, he continued this success, winning the Fujitsu V8 Supercars Series in his first season in the competition, and winning eight out of the 18 races in the process. He stepped into the Team Kiwi Racing Falcon in 2007, after Paul Radisich was still recovering from an accident at Bathurst in 2006. For the Bathurst 1000 and Sandown 500 he raced the Ford Falcon BF of Britek Motorsport for the second year driving with Jason Bright.

Macrow's younger brother Tim, who also races, won the 2007 Australian Drivers' Championship.

He works as a driver coach for Borland Racing Developments and owns AMR Kartsport, which specialises in engine, chassis and driver development.

Career results

Complete Bathurst 1000 results

References 

 Herald Sun 15 August 2003: 
 Michael Lynch — The Age 26 August 2003: 
 Auto Action 13–19 August 2003: 
 Motor Racing Australia Issue No. 74: 
 Conrod V8 - 
 V8 Supercars - 
 Australian Formula Ford -

External links 
 Official Peb Page
 
 Racing Reference profile

1978 births
Formula Ford drivers
Formula Holden drivers
Living people
Racing drivers from Melbourne
Supercars Championship drivers